Myrna Lila Lamb (August 3, 1930, Newark, New Jersey – September 15, 2017, Point Pleasant Beach, New Jersey) was an American playwright.

Career
Myrna Lamb graduated from The New School and Rutgers University. Anselma dell'Olio, film critic and director, selected her work for a feminist Theater production at the Martinique Theater in May 1969. Several of her works were produced by the Women's Interart Theatre in New York City, which had started around 1969. This theatre showcased work by women playwrights and directors.

Myrna Lamb died of heart disease on September 15, 2017, aged 87.

Awards
 1971 Biennale de Paris production grant
 1973 Rockefeller Fellowship residency grant for New York Shakespeare Festival
 1973 Guggenheim Fellowship
 1974, 1975 National Endowment for the Arts Music Program grant
 1977 New York Shakespeare Festival grant (Playwrights on Payroll)

Works
 Apple Pie, 1976, New York Shakespeare Festival, New York City
 Ballad Of Brooklyn, 1979, Brooklyn Academy of Music, New York
 But What Have You Done for Me Lately, Washington Square Church, NYC 1968
 The Butcher Shop, Oberlin College, OH
 The Comeback Act, Interart Theatre, NYC
 Crab Quadrille, Interart Theatre, NYC, 1976
 I Lost A Pair Of Gloves Yesterday, Manhattan Theatre Club, NY
 In The Shadow of The Crematoria, Martinique Theatre, NYC
 Jillila	
 Mod Donna, 1970, New York Shakespeare Festival, New York City
 Monologia:The Mod Donna and Scylon Z, Interart Theatre, NYC 1971
 Mother Ann
 Olympic Park, New York Shakespeare Festival, NYC (reading)
 Pas de Deux, Oberlin College, OH
 The Sacrifice, AMDA Theatre, NYC
 The Serving-Girl and the Lady, Martinique Theatre, NYC
 Two Party System

Screenplays
 Balloon
 Blood Alley
 Dead Center
 Point Pleasant America
 Treatments for King of the Blitz

References

External links
Interview with Myrna Lamb about Women Playwrights in WNED public television series “Woman”, 1974
"Myrna Lamb", doollee
"A Woman's Work...", The Harvard Crimson, Joan Feigenbaum, April 08, 1978 
"American Women Dramatists: 1960-1980", Southeastern Theatre Conference (Nashville, TN, March 5-9, 1980)

1930 births
2017 deaths
American dramatists and playwrights
The New School alumni
Rutgers University alumni
Writers from Newark, New Jersey